Rosai is an Italian surname. Notable people with the surname include:

 Juan Rosai (1940–2020), Italian-born American physician
 Ottone Rosai (1895–1957), Italian painter

See also
 Rosa (surname)

Italian-language surnames